HMS Aeneas (P427) was a British  of the Royal Navy, built by Cammell Laird and launched on 9 October 1945. It was named after the hero Aeneas from Greek mythology.

Service history 
Aeneas took part in the Coronation Review of the Fleet to celebrate the Coronation of Queen Elizabeth II in 1953.

Aeneas played the part of the M1 submarine in the 1967 James Bond film You Only Live Twice.
 
In 1972 Aeneas was hired by Vickers for use in what proved to be successful trials of the Submarine-Launched Airflight Missile (SLAM) system, an anti-aircraft system using a cluster of four Shorts Blowpipe missiles on an extendable mast, allowing attacks against low flying aircraft while the submarine was at periscope depth.Aeneas was broken up in 1974.

On 26 September 2012, at the company's Le Mourillon plant, DNCS announced plans to design and build a submarine canister-based air defence weapon based on MBDA's Mistral. The concept is based on the British SLAM, Submarine Launched Airflight Missile which was based on the Blowpipe developed by Vickers in the 1970s, and used on HMS Aeneas.

References

 Further reading 
 
 Submarines in Colour'' by Bill Gunston - Blandford Colour Series - Blandford - 1976 -

External links
 Pictures of HMS Aeneas at MaritimeQuest

 

Amphion-class submarines
Cold War submarines of the United Kingdom
Ships built on the River Mersey
1945 ships